Farrington is both a given name and a surname. Notable people with this name include:

Surname
 Adele Farrington (1867–1936), American actor
 Amy Farrington (born 1966), American actor
 Sir Anthony Farrington, 1st Baronet (1742–1823), General of the British Army
 Benjamin Farrington (1891–1974), Irish classicist
 Betty Farrington (1898–1989), American character actress 
 Bo Farrington (1936–1964), American football player
 Colleen Farrington (born 1936), American model and nightclub singer
 David P. Farrington (born 1944), British criminologist
 Don Farrington (died 2000), American aviator
 Edward Silsby Farrington (1856–1929), American judge
 Elizabeth P. Farrington (1898–1984), Honolulu Star-Bulletin publisher, Congressional Delegate for the Territory of Hawaii and wife of Joseph Rider Farrington
 Frank Farrington (actor) (1873–1924), American silent film actor
 Frank Farrington (rugby league) (1926–2014), Australian rugby league player
 Frank G. Farrington (1872–1933), American lawyer and politician from Maine
 Fred Farrington (died 1931), British footballer
 George Farrington, English footballer
 Gregory C. Farrington, 12th president of Lehigh University
 Harry Webb Farrington (1879–1930), American author
 Iain Farrington (born 1977), British pianist, organist, composer and arranger
 James Farrington (1791–1859), New Hampshire politician
 James Edward Butler Futtit Farrington (1908–2002), polar explorer
 Jeff Farrington, American politician from Michigan
 John Farrington (disambiguation), multiple people, including:
John Farrington (footballer) (born 1947), English professional footballer
John Farrington (athlete) (born 1942), Australian long-distance runner
John Farrington (MP) (1609–1680), Member of Parliament (MP) for Chichester
 Joseph Rider Farrington (1897–1954), Honolulu Star-Bulletin publisher and Congressional Delegate for the Territory of Hawaii
 Josie Farrington, Baroness Farrington of Ribbleton (1940–2018), British Labour Party politician
 Kaitlyn Farrington (born 1989), American snowboarder
 Ken Farrington (born 1936), English actor
 Mark Farrington (born 1965), English footballer
 Michael Farrington (born 1966), Canadian ice dancer
 Neil Farrington (died 2009), English musician
 Oliver C. Farrington (1864–1934), American geologist
 Richard Farrington (1702–1772), Welsh Anglican priest and antiquarian
Sinead Farrington, British particle physicist
 Sloane Farrington (1923–1997), Bahamian competitive sailor
Suzanne Farrington (1933–2015), married name of the only child of actress Vivien Leigh
 Thomas Farrington (disambiguation), several people
 Wallace Rider Farrington (1871–1933), Honolulu Star-Bulletin publisher and Governor of the Territory of Hawaii
 William Farrington (soldier) ( 1412), English soldier and diplomat
 William Farrington (Royalist) (died 1659), English politician
 Yolanda Ivonne Montes Farrington (born 1932), American-born exotic dancer and actor

Given name
 Farrington Daniels (1889–1972), American physical chemist

Fictional character 

 Harriet Farrington, protagonist of 1980s British TV series Farrington of the F.O.